Dream Tracks is a Canadian documentary film, directed by Jean-Daniel Lafond and released in 1986. The film is a portrait of the life and work of Quebec filmmaker Pierre Perrault.

Reviewing the film for Cinema Canada, Marika Csano wrote that "It would have been easy for Lafond to be content with a static heroic tableau of Pierre Perrault hunting images. What makes Les Traces du reve interesting is that we watch Perrault evolve from beginning to end. Perhaps Lafond was aware that from the idealized opening portrait, Perrault increasingly becomes a vulnerable human being. Pierre Perrault is led to participate in his own analysis, questioning himself and his work. The conclusion is nostalgic, and has the feel of a despairing testament."

The film received a Genie Award nomination for Best Feature Length Documentary at the 8th Genie Awards in 1987.

References

External links
 

1986 films
1986 documentary films
Canadian documentary films
National Film Board of Canada documentaries
Documentary films about film directors and producers
Quebec films
French-language Canadian films
1980s Canadian films